The Winkler Centennial Arena, formerly the Winkler Recreation Complex and commonly referred to as the Winkler Arena, is a 2,000-seat multi-purpose arena located in Winkler, Manitoba, Canada. It is home to the Winkler Flyers of the Manitoba Junior Hockey League. The Winkler Arena is Winkler's premier hockey facility. It is located next to the Winkler Aquatic Centre and the Winkler Curling Club. 

On February 9, 2008, CBC's annual Hockey Day In Canada broadcast was hosted from Winkler Centennial Arena.   

The 2015 Scotties Tournament of Hearts Provincial Championship was held at the Winkler Centennial Arena. The event ran from January 21–25. 

The 2018 Viterra Championship was hosted in Winkler Centennial Arena. The event ran from January 31-February 4.

Winkler's two high schools play their home games in the arena: the Garden Valley Collegiate Zodiacs and the Northlands Parkway Collegiate Nighthawks.

References

External links
  City of Winkler

Indoor arenas in Manitoba
Indoor ice hockey venues in Canada
Sport in Winkler, Manitoba
1967 establishments in Manitoba
Sports venues completed in 1967